Henri Louis-Victor-Mars Rollin (November 9, 1885 – April 1955) was a French naval officer, spy, journalist and essayist.

In 1903, he joined the French Navy and served on battleship Diderot in World War I. He subsequently served on Paris II and was taken prisoner by Mustafa Ertuğrul Aker on December 13, 1917, after the sinking of the ship.

In 1939, he published L'Apocalypse de notre temps and explored the world of intrigue that helped fabricate the forgery Protocols of the Elders of Zion.

1885 births
1955 deaths
People of the French Third Republic
French male essayists
20th-century French essayists
20th-century French male writers